Marquette Catholic High School may refer to:

Marquette Catholic High School (Alton, Illinois)
Marquette Catholic High School (Michigan City, Indiana)
Marquette High School (Bellevue, Iowa)
Marquette High School (Ottawa, Illinois)
Marquette Catholic Schools, with a high school campus in West Point, Iowa